The 2020 Civic Democratic Party (ODS) leadership election was held on 18 January 2020. The incumbent leader Petr Fiala was running for another term as the sole candidate. Fiala was reelected with 90% of the vote.

Background
Petr Fiala has been the leader of the party since 2014. Leadership elections are held every 2 years.

Vysočina regional organisation held a meeting on 2 November 2019. It gave its nomination to Petr Fiala. Fiala was supported by almost all delegates.

Fiala then received nominations from other regional organisations, being the only candidate.

Candidates
Petr Fiala, the incumbent leader.

Voting

References

2020
2020 elections in the Czech Republic
Indirect elections
Civic Democratic Party leadership election
January 2020 events in the Czech Republic